St. Joseph River may refer to: 

St. Joseph River (Lake Michigan) in southwest Michigan and northwest Indiana
St. Joseph River (Maumee River tributary) in south-central Michigan, northwest Ohio and northeast Indiana
Saint Joseph River (Dominica)